Mengjiang royal family was the family of Prince Demchugdongrub, the puppet ruler of Mengjiang, a part of Inner Mongolia controlled by the Japanese during the Second Sino-Japanese War.

 Demchugdongrub, Mongol prince of the Qing dynasty and ruler of Mengjiang
 Namuzilewangchuke, Demchugdongrub's father and the chief of the Xilinguole Alliance
 Taijide princess, Demchugdongrub's wife
 Dugursulong, Demchugdongrub's son
 Taijide princess of the Abaga Banner, Demchugdongrub's daughter
 Shanqi, a distant relative of Demchugdongrub
 Kawashima Yoshiko, Shanqi's daughter

History of Inner Mongolia
Mengjiang
Mongol rulers
Mengjiang